Arindam Guin, also known as Bubai, is an Indian politician and member of All India Trinamool Congress. He was elected as MLA of West Bengal Legislative Assembly in 2021 assembly election from Champdani  Constituency. He was also a Councillor since 2010 and well known Chairperson of Baidyabati Municipality since 2015 to 2021. Now He is holding the post of Trinamool Congress Hooghly dist President. He is well known as AG Boss in Hooghly dist.

References 

Trinamool Congress politicians from West Bengal
Living people
People from Hooghly district
West Bengal MLAs 2021–2026
Year of birth missing (living people)